aLIVE in Florida is the second live album by Rebecca St. James. It was released on March 20, 2007 as a CD/DVD combination, and features live versions of fan favorites.

Track listing 
 "Intro"
 "God Help Me"
 "Lamb of God"
 "Wait For Me"
 "You Are Loved" (acoustic)
 "Beautiful Stranger"
 "Reborn"
 "Thank You" (with Joel)
 "Without Love" (performed by Joel & Luke)
 "Lion"
 "Take All of Me"
 "Blessed Be Your Name"
 "Forgive Me"
 "Alive"
 "You Are Loved (hisboyelroy's funk house mix)" bonus studio track

Source:

DVD
Track listing:
 "Intro"
 "God Help Me"
 "Lamb of God"
 "Wait For Me"
 "You Are Loved (Acoustic)"
 "Beautiful Stranger"
 "Compassion International Talk"
 "Reborn"
 "Thank You" (with Joel)
 "Without Love" (performed by Joel & Luke)
 "Take All of Me"
 "Blessed Be Your Name"
 "Forgive Me"
 "Alive"
 "Blessed Be Your Name (Reprise)"
 "God Help Me Concept Video"
 "Forgive Me Concept Video"
 "Compassion International Video"

References

2007 live albums
2007 video albums
Christian live video albums
ForeFront Records live albums
ForeFront Records video albums
Live video albums
Rebecca St. James albums